Pille is an Estonian feminine given name; a cognate and occasional diminutive of the given name Sibülle.

The first name Pille appears in Estonian folk songs and in church registers in the 18th and 19th centuries and was an Estonian-language variant of the German given name Sibylle/Sibylla, which itself is derived from the Latin sibylla, and in turn from the Ancient Greek Σίβυλλα (sibylla). After largely falling out of usage, the name was revived in 1929 in the recommended list of names by the Estonian Mother Tongue Society (Emakeele Seltsi). It became a widely popular name following 1955. 

As of 1 January 2021, 2,532 women in Estonia have the first name Pille, making it the 55th most popular female name in the country.

Individuals bearing the name Pille include:

Pille Lill (born 1962), opera soprano
Pille Lukin-Kangur (born 1973), actress
Pille Pürg (born 1972), actress and comedian 
Pille Raadik (born 1987), footballer
Pille Saar (born 1961), pianist and educator
Pille Tomson (born 1960), nature conservationist
Pille Valk (1959–2009), historian and theologian

References

Feminine given names
Estonian feminine given names